The Roman Catholic Metropolitan Archdiocese of Guayaquil is an archdiocese located in the city of Guayaquil in Ecuador.

Special churches
Minor Basilica:
 Basílica de Nuestra Señora de La Merced in Guayaquil

Leadership
Bishops of Guayaquil
Francisco Xavier de Garaycoa (1838 – 5 Sep 1851), appointed Archbishop of Quito
Tomás Aguirre (22 Jul 1861 – 14 May 1868)
José María Lizarzabaru y Borja, S.J. (22 Nov 1869 – 17 Oct 1877)
Roberto Maria Pozo y Martin, S.J. (13 Nov 1884 – 1909)
Juan María Riera, O.P. (19 Jan 1912 – 20 Nov 1915)
Andrés Machado, S.J. (26 Apr 1916 – 22 Jan 1926)
Carlos María Javier de la Torre (20 Dec 1926 – 8 Sep 1933), appointed Archbishop of Quito (Cardinal in 1953)
Giuseppe Felix Heredia Zurita, S.J. (16 Dec 1937 – 2 Aug 1954)
Cesar Antonio Mosquera Corral* (11 Oct 1954 – 11 Mar 1969)
Became archbishop on 22 Jan 1956
Archbishops of Guayaquil
Bernardino Carlos Guillermo Honorato Echeverría Ruiz, O.F.M. (10 Apr 1969 – 7 Dec 1989); elevated to Cardinal in 1994
Juan Ignacio Larrea Holguín (7 Dec 1989 – 7 May 2003)
Antonio Arregui Yarza (7 May 2003 – 24 Sep 2015)
Luís Cabrera Herrera, O.F.M. (24 Sep 2015 – present)

Coadjutor archbishop
Juan Ignacio Larrea Holguín (1988-1989)

Auxiliary bishops
Luis Tola y Avilés (1863-1871), appointed Bishop of Portoviejo (Porto Vecchio)
Silvio Luis Haro Alvear (1950-1955), appointed Bishop of Ibarra
José Gabriel Diaz Cueva (1964-1967), appointed Auxiliary Bishop of Cuenca
Vicente Rodrigo Cisneros Durán (1967-1969), appointed Bishop of Ambato
Ernesto Alvarez Alvarez, S.D.B. (1967-1970 and, as Archbishop (personal title), 1980-1984), appointed Coadjutor Archbishop of Cuenca in 1970
Raúl Eduardo Vela Chiriboga (1972-1975), appointed Bishop of Azogues; future Cardinal
Hugolino Felix Cerasuolo Stacey, O.F.M. (1975-1985), appointed Bishop of Loja
Luis Enrique Orellana Ricaurte, S.J. (1978-1986), appointed Auxiliary Bishop of Quito
Olindo Natale Spagnolo Martellozzo, M.C.C.I. (1990-2001)
Victor Manuel Maldonado Barreno, O.F.M. (1990-2003)
Aníbal Nieto Guerra, O.C.D. (2006-2009), appointed Bishop of San Jacinto de Yaguachi
Marcos Aurelio Pérez Caicedo (2006-2012), appointed Bishop of Babahoyo
Valter Dario Maggi (2008-2011), appointed Bishop of Ibarra
Guido Iván Minda Chalá (2009-2022)
Giovanni Battista Piccioli (2013-2022)
Bertram Víctor Wick Enzler (2013-2015), appointed Bishop of Santo Domingo en Ecuador
Antonio Crameri, S.S.C. (2019-2021)
Gerardo Miguel Nieves Loja (since 2021)

Other priests of this diocese who became bishops
Eduardo José Castillo Pino, appointed Auxiliary Bishop of Portoviejo in 2012

Suffragan dioceses
Diocese of Babahoyo
Diocese of Daule
Diocese of San Jacinto
Diocese of Santa Elena

See also
Roman Catholicism in Ecuador

Sources
GCatholic.org
Catholic Hierarchy
Diocese website (Old website)

Guayaquil
Roman Catholic dioceses in Ecuador
Roman Catholic Ecclesiastical Province of Guayaquil
Religious organizations established in 1838
Roman Catholic dioceses and prelatures established in the 19th century
1838 establishments in Ecuador